Wardrop Engineering Inc. was a civil engineering and engineering consulting firm based in Winnipeg. It was acquired by Tetra Tech in 2009.

Company profile
Les Wardrop started Wardrop Engineering in 1955  in Winnipeg, Manitoba, Canada. Initial projects consisting primarily of public works engineering and residential subdivision servicing. Building upon early successes, Wardrop opened a second office in Port Arthur (now Thunder Bay), Ontario, Canada in 1956.

The 1960s saw Wardrop embark upon expansion, diversification and quality. By this time, Wardrop expanded its engineering disciplines to include civil, mechanical, structural, and electrical, with established offices in Winnipeg, Thunder Bay, and Regina. It was in the Winnipeg office, where the firm first started working in the Canadian nuclear industry.

The 1970s were a time of growth and maturity. Wardrop launched projects in West Africa and the International Division was created. At the same time, a branch office was established in Edmonton and assignments across Canada grew to include pulp and paper, and solar energy.

Computerization and advanced technology were the thrust of the 1980s. Wardrop expanded to Toronto, and opened an office to pursue nuclear waste management, fusion energy, environmental challenges, and the aerospace industry. Along the way, the firm changed its name to Wardrop Engineering Inc. To meet the changing needs of the marketplace, Wardrop Applied Systems Inc. was formed to accommodate the development of new prototype designs for industrial applications.

The 1990s was a decade of sustainable development, space stations, re-engineering, and an explosion of computer software design tools for real-time industrial process control and information management. The quality and delivery of Wardrop's products were enhanced through advanced in-house management systems, once thought impossible. A Saskatoon office and three new Wardrop companies were launched.

Wardrop was named one of Canada's Top 100 Employers, as published in Maclean's magazine, for the years 2003, 2004, 2006 2007, and 2008, and also one of Canada's Top 20 Best Employers for New Canadians for the year of 2008.

In January 2009, Tetra Tech acquired Wardrop, expanding Tetra Tech to more than 10,000 staff.

Divisions
Wardrop had several divisions:
 Energy
 Infrastructure
 Mining
 Oil & Gas Industrial
 International

Major Projects
Provencher Bridge

References

External links
 Official website

Engineering consulting firms of Canada
Construction and civil engineering companies established in 1955
Technology companies disestablished in 2009
2009 mergers and acquisitions
Engineering companies of Canada
1955 establishments in Manitoba
2009 disestablishments in Manitoba

Defunct companies based in Winnipeg
Technology companies of Manitoba